Jane Esther Hamilton (born October 27, 1956) is an American former pornographic actress and current adult film director who performed under the stage name Veronica Hart during the 1980s. She is sometimes credited as Jane Hamilton, V. Hart, Veronica Heart, Victoria Holt, Randee Styles or just Veronica. Hart is a member of the AVN Hall of Fame.
Director Paul Thomas Anderson has called her "the Meryl Streep of porn."

Early life
Hart was born and raised in Las Vegas, Nevada. She graduated from high school at age 16 and the University of Nevada, Las Vegas at age 19 in 1976 with a degree in theatrical arts. After school she worked in England before returning to the United States and moving to New York City.

Career
Hart appeared in pornographic films from 1980 until 1982 and is best known for her performances in Amanda by Night, Wanda Whips Wall Street, Roommates and A Scent of Heather. She would often portray "stylish native New Yorker" characters in her films. Around 1984, she began directing segments on the Playboy TV series Electric Blue, appearing in B-Movies and working as a stripper. During the 1990s, 2000s and 2010s she directed, edited, and produced pornographic films, while making occasional (non-sexual) cameos in both mainstream and adult productions.

With the sale of VCA, her primary production company, to Hustler in 2003, and the direction of the company moving from feature, storyline-driven films to Gonzo, she left the company when her existing contract expired. Afterwards, Hart moved on to other work, including working as a tour guide at the Erotic Heritage Museum in Las Vegas.

Hart has acted in off-Broadway theater productions such as The House of Bernarda Alba, A Thurber Carnival, The Dyke And The Porn Star, and The Deep Throat Sex Scandal.

Hart portrays a judge in the film Boogie Nights and also appears in another Paul Thomas Anderson movie, Magnolia.

As of 2014 Hart had become a sex educator in China. An article in AVN magazine stated that she has been instructing women through an arrangement with a chain of adult retail stores and clubs called Sediva Maison.

Personal life
Hart married adult industry sound technician Michael Hunt in 1982, although they have since divorced. She has two sons, Chris and Max, who attended magnet schools for highly gifted students. Hart's career had a negative impact on her sons, with her saying "It's horrible for them... I'm their loving mommy and nobody likes to think of their parents having sex and being famous for it. I'm not ashamed of what I do. I take responsibility for who I am. I chose. From the time they were kids, my stripping gear was washed and hanging in my bathtub. At the same time I apologize to my kids for how the choices in my life have affected them. They're well adjusted and can joke with me about it: I know I'm going to spend the rest of my life on the couch".

Selected TV appearances 
Six Feet Under, Jean Louise Macarthur a.k.a. Viveca St. John - in season 1's episode "An Open Book" (2001)
 Lady Chatterly's Stories, Amy (as Jane Hamilton) - in the episode "The Manuscript" (2001)
 First Years, Lola - in the episode "Porn in the USA" (2001)

Awards
Wins

1981
AFAA for Best Actress – Amanda by Night

1982
AFAA Award for Best Actress – Roommates

AFAA Award for Best Supporting Actress – Foxtrot

1996
AVN Award for Best Non-Sex Performance – Nylon

1999
XRCO Award for Best Video - Torn (directed and produced by Hart)

2004 
XRCO Award for Best Comedy or Parody - Misty Beethoven: The Musical (directed, edited and produced by Hart)

AVN Hall of Fame
XRCO Hall of Fame

Nominations

 2001
AVN Best Director – Video for White Lightning
 2002
AVN Best Director – Film for Taken
 2003
AVN Best Director – Video for Crime and Passion
 2004
AVN Best Director – Film for Barbara Broadcast Too
 2005
AVN Best Director – Film for Misty Beethoven: The Musical
 2006
AVN Best Non-Sex Performance for Eternity
 2007
AVN Best Non-Sex Performance for Sex Pix
 2008
AVN Best Non-Sex Performance for Delilah
2009
AVN Best Non-Sex Performance for Roller Dollz

Literature
  Dedicated to her, and one chapter covers Hart's early career.
  Features a chapter on Hart.

References

External links

  chat transcript for The Secret History of the Other Hollywood
 
 
 
 

1956 births
American female adult models
American female erotic dancers
American erotic dancers
American pornographic film actresses
American film actresses
American pornographic film directors
American pornographic film producers
Women pornographic film directors
Women pornographic film producers
American women film producers
Living people
Actresses from Las Vegas
Pornographic film actors from Nevada
University of Nevada, Las Vegas alumni
20th-century American actresses
21st-century American women